Arlene Boxall (born 9 October 1961) is a former field hockey player from Zimbabwe, who was a member of the national team that won the gold medal at the 1980 Summer Olympics in Moscow. The youngest member of the team at 18 years old, she was its reserve goalkeeper. She never came onto the field, but still received a gold medal alongside her teammates.

At the time she was an operations clerk in Air Force of Zimbabwe.

References

1961 births
Living people
Zimbabwean female field hockey players
Olympic field hockey players of Zimbabwe
Field hockey players at the 1980 Summer Olympics
Olympic gold medalists for Zimbabwe
Olympic medalists in field hockey
White Zimbabwean sportspeople
Zimbabwean military personnel
Medalists at the 1980 Summer Olympics